Hector Thompson ( – ) was an Australian professional boxer who competed in four different weight divisions—lightweight, super lightweight, welterweight and junior middleweight—during the 1970s and 80s.
Was married to Lynette Slee in 1965/6 unknown divorce date.

Professional career
In 1973 he beat Joe Tetteh for the Commonwealth (British Empire) Super lightweight title, earning a shot at Roberto Durán in 1973 for the World Boxing Association World lightweight title but lost by technical knockout (TKO). After capturing the Commonwealth title again in 1975, later that year he would go on to challenge Antonio Cervantes for the World Boxing Association World light welterweight title but he lost by RTD. He was inducted into the Australian National Boxing Hall of Fame in 2005. Two of Hector Thompson's opponents died after being TKOd by Thompson—Roko Spanja in 1970 and Chuck Wilburn in 1976.

References

External links

Image - Hector Thompson

Was periodically married to Lynette Slee (M.1965/6) unknown D.

2020 deaths
1949 births
Light-middleweight boxers
Lightweight boxers
Light-welterweight boxers
People from the Mid North Coast
Welterweight boxers
Australian male boxers
Commonwealth Boxing Council champions
Sportsmen from New South Wales